Oscar Waldmann (25 June 1856 – 15 March 1937) was a Swiss sculptor. His work was part of the sculpture event in the art competition at the 1924 Summer Olympics.

References

1856 births
1937 deaths
19th-century Swiss sculptors
20th-century Swiss sculptors
Olympic competitors in art competitions
Artists from Geneva
20th-century Swiss male artists